Baviyeh or Buyeh may refer to:
 Buyeh, Gilan
 Baviyeh, Hormozgan